David Elwood Rowe (October 9, 1854 – December 9, 1930) was an American outfielder and manager in Major League Baseball (MLB).

Baseball career
Rowe was born in Cold Spring Township, Lebanon County, Pennsylvania, in 1854. He had a younger brother, Jack Rowe, who also played and managed in the major leagues.

Dave Rowe started his professional baseball career playing two games for the Chicago White Stockings of the National League (NL) in 1877. In 1882, he made it back to the majors with the NL's Cleveland Blues, playing 24 games for them. In 1883, he played 59 games for the Baltimore Orioles of the American Association (AA).

In 1884, Rowe played for the St. Louis Maroons, which won the Union Association (UA) championship in that league's only year of existence. In 109 games, he had a batting average of .293 and led the UA in at bats with 485. Rowe stayed with the Maroons when they joined the NL in 1885, playing 16 games for them that season.

In 1886, Rowe was a player-manager for the NL's Kansas City Cowboys, appearing in 105 games for them. In 1887, he was a player-manager for the Lincoln Tree Planters of the Western League (WL). In 1888, Rowe played 32 games for the AA's Kansas City Cowboys. That was his last appearance in the major leagues.

Rowe was a player-manager for Denver of the Western Association (WA) in 1889 and 1890. In 1891, he was a player-manager for the WA's Lincoln Rustlers. He finished his professional baseball playing career in 1892 as a player-manager of the WL's Omaha Omahogs.

During his MLB career, Rowe played 347 games and had a .263 batting average, 8 home runs, 223 runs scored, and 90 runs batted in. He also played four games as a pitcher and had a 1–2 win–loss record with a 9.78 earned run average and 3 strikeouts.

In a game on July 24, 1882, Rowe pitched nine innings and allowed 35 runs to score, 12 of them earned, in a loss. This remains the single-game record for most runs scored against a pitcher in MLB history.

Rowe died in Glendale, California, in 1930. He is buried in Forest Lawn Memorial Park in Glendale.

See also
List of Major League Baseball player-managers

References

External links

1854 births
1930 deaths
19th-century baseball players
Major League Baseball outfielders
Major League Baseball player-managers
Chicago White Stockings players
Cleveland Blues (NL) players
Baltimore Orioles (AA) players
St. Louis Maroons players
Kansas City Cowboys (NL) players
Kansas City Cowboys players
Kansas City Cowboys (AA) managers
Minor league baseball managers
Rockford White Stockings players
Lincoln Tree Planters players
Minneapolis Millers (baseball) players
Denver Grizzlies (baseball) players
Denver Mountaineers players
Lincoln Rustlers players
Omaha Omahogs players
Baseball players from Pennsylvania
Burials at Forest Lawn Memorial Park (Glendale)